Bubblegum Dreams may refer to:

Bubblegum Dreams, 1997 EP by The Queers
"Bubblegum Dreams", 2017 song by Ariel Pink from the album Dedicated to Bobby Jameson